Mount (also known as Mount Halt) was a station located near the town of Carrickfergus in Northern Ireland. At one time it formed part of a tight cluster of stations, each located one minute from the other.

The station itself was a semi-private halt serving the local Courtaulds nylon factory. It closed in 1977 when Northern Ireland Railways services were cut back, though the factory remained open until the 1990s. Due to track re-laying and maintenance work, most traces of the platforms are gone. However, the site of the station is still visible, as the now-abandoned path from the factory premises to the station site still exists, and is easily noticed by virtue of a tarmac area with metal fencing and the old station lamp posts.

References

Disused railway stations in County Antrim
Railway stations opened in 1925
Railway stations closed in 1977
1925 establishments in Northern Ireland
1977 disestablishments in Northern Ireland
Railway stations in Northern Ireland opened in the 20th century